Souillac (Languedocien: Solhac) is a commune in the Lot department in south-western France, on the river Dordogne. It is the site of the Brive–Souillac Airport, which opened in 2010. The town hosts an annual jazz festival in July. The abbey church has famous Romanesque carvings.

Geography
Souillac is in the upper Dordogne Valley where the river cuts through the limestone plateau of Haut-Quercy, a historic name for the northern part of the Department of Lot. This is part of the Massif Central, an elevated region in south central France. To the north of Souillac lies the commune of Lachapelle-Auzac, to the east Mayrac and Pinsac, to the south Lanzac, to the south west Peyrillac-et-Millac and Cazoulès, to the west Orliaguet and to the northwest Salignac-Eyvigues, Borrèze and Gignac. Souillac station has rail connections to Brive-la-Gaillarde, Cahors and Toulouse.

The town
Souillac is a small market town, and is the hub for the area. This is an agricultural region which is known for its walnuts, strawberries and quiet, rural way of life.

Population

Tourism
The most notable building in the town is the abbey church of Sainte-Marie. The domed roofs are similar to but rather smaller than those of Périgueux Cathedral. Fragments of the original Romanesque sculptures are grouped just inside the west door. Behind the abbey church is the Musée de l'Automate which has a large collection of mechanical figures and dolls.

An international jazz festival is held annually in the town in July. The festival was started in 1976 by a group of volunteers enthused by Sim Copans, a United States Army non-combatant in World War I who came to live in nearby Lanzac. The festival features live concerts and other jazz-related activities.

See also
 Communes of the Lot department

References

External links

Communes of Lot (department)
Quercy